Carbon copy is a simple document copying technique, as well as a header in e-mail.

Carbon Copy may also refer to:

 Carbon Copy (film), a 1981 comedy film directed by Michael Schultz
 Carbon Copy (horse)
 Carbon Copy (software), an early remote control and file transfer software for DOS and Windows published by Microcom
 Carbon Copy Media, a record label
 A "full name" for Cc the cat
 A horse which participated at the Cox Plate
 An analog delay effect pedal by MXR